Mitchell Myers (born July 15, 1999) is an American soccer player who plays as a defender.

Career

Early career 
Myers attended South Aiken High School, where he was a four-time all-region selection for his high school squad, earned all-state honors twice, and led team to lower state championship game. Myers also playing club soccer for the Carolina Elite Soccer Academy, where he was a part of three state championship teams.

In 2017, Myers attended the University of South Carolina to play college soccer. Myers did not play during the 2019 season, but across the 2017 and 2018 season, Myers made 34 appearances, scoring three goals and tallying six assists. He was named Third Team All-Conference USA in 2018. 

In 2020, Myers transferred to Wofford College, missing the 2020–21 season due to injury, but made 16 appearances in 2021, scoring two goals and leading the team with seven assists. Myers also earned All-SoCon First Team honors.

While at college, Myers was part of the South Carolina United team who competed in the USL League Two, making nine regular season appearances and scoring a single goal in 2019. Myers was part of the team in 2021, but didn't make an appearance.

Professional 
On February 9, 2022, Myers signed with USL Championship side Memphis 901. He made his professional debut on March 12, 2022, appearing as a 77th–minute substitute during a 0–3 loss to Pittsburgh Riverhounds.

References

External links 
 Mitchell Myers Player Profile

1999 births
Living people
American soccer players
Association football defenders
Memphis 901 FC players
People from Aiken, South Carolina
SC United Bantams players
Soccer players from South Carolina
South Carolina Gamecocks men's soccer players
USL Championship players
Wofford Terriers men's soccer players